

This is a list of the National Register of Historic Places listings in Hancock County, Maine.

This is intended to be a complete list of the properties and districts on the National Register of Historic Places in Hancock County, Maine, United States. Latitude and longitude coordinates are provided for many National Register properties and districts; these locations may be seen together in a map.

There are 130 properties and districts listed on the National Register in the county, including two National Historic Landmarks.  Another three properties were once listed but have been removed.

Current listings

|}

Former listings

|}

See also

 List of National Historic Landmarks in Maine
 National Register of Historic Places listings in Maine
 National Register of Historic Places listings in Acadia National Park

References

External links
"Historic properties list revised" - Mount Desert Islander, March 30, 2017

Hancock